Vinod Mathur (born 11 November 1953 in Jaipur, Rajasthan) is an Indian computer hardware engineer who played for Rajasthan cricket team from 1971 to 1985. He played 83 first-class and four List A matches. He was named in Rajasthan High Court panel of selectors  for selection of senior cricket teams.

References

External links
 
 RCA
 cricketarchive

1994 births
Living people
Indian cricketers
Rajasthan cricketers
Cricketers from Jaipur